Now, Voyager is a 1942 American drama film starring Bette Davis, Paul Henreid, and Claude Rains, and directed by Irving Rapper. The screenplay by Casey Robinson is based on the 1941 novel of the same name by Olive Higgins Prouty.

Prouty borrowed her title from the Walt Whitman poem "The Untold Want", which reads in its entirety,

In 2007, Now, Voyager was selected for preservation in the United States National Film Registry by the Library of Congress as being "culturally, historically, or aesthetically significant." The film ranks number 23 on AFI's 100 Years ... 100 Passions, a list of the top love stories in American cinema. Film critic Steven Jay Schneider suggests the film continues to be remembered for not only its star power, but also the "emotional crescendos" engendered in the storyline.

Plot
Charlotte Vale is a drab, quiet woman whose life is brutally dominated by her mother (Gladys Cooper), an aristocratic Boston dowager whose verbal and emotional abuse of her daughter has contributed to Charlotte's complete lack of self-confidence. Mrs. Vale had already brought up three sons, and Charlotte was an unwanted child born to her late in life. Fearing that Charlotte is on the verge of a nervous breakdown, her sister-in-law Lisa introduces her to psychiatrist Dr. Jaquith (Claude Rains), who recommends that she spend time in his sanitarium.

Away from her mother's control, Charlotte blossoms, and at Lisa's urging, the transformed woman opts to take a lengthy cruise instead of going home immediately. On the ship, she meets Jeremiah Duvaux Durrance (Paul Henreid), a married man traveling with his friends Deb and Frank McIntyre. From them, Charlotte learns of how Jerry's devotion to his young daughter Christina (Tina) keeps him from divorcing his wife, a manipulative, jealous woman who does not love Tina and keeps Jerry from engaging in his chosen career of architecture, despite the fulfillment he gets from it.

Charlotte and Jerry become friendly, and in Rio de Janeiro, the two are stranded on Sugarloaf Mountain when their car crashes. They miss the ship and spend five days together before Charlotte flies to Buenos Aires to rejoin the cruise. Although they have fallen in love, they decide it would be best not to see each other again.

Charlotte's family is stunned by the dramatic changes in her appearance and demeanor when she arrives home. Her mother is determined to destroy her daughter once again, but Charlotte is resolved to remain independent. The memory of Jerry's love and devotion helps give her the strength she needs to remain resolute.

Charlotte becomes engaged to wealthy, well-connected widower Elliot Livingston (John Loder), but after a chance meeting with Jerry, she breaks off the engagement, about which she quarrels with her mother. During the argument, Charlotte says she did not ask to be born, that her mother never wanted her, and it has "been a calamity on both sides". Mrs. Vale has a heart attack and dies. Guilty and distraught, Charlotte returns to the sanitarium.

When she arrives at the sanitarium, she is immediately diverted from her own problems when she meets Jerry's 12-year-old daughter Tina, who has been sent to Dr. Jaquith by her father based on Charlotte's recommendation. Tina greatly reminds Charlotte of herself; both were unwanted and unloved by their mothers. Shaken from her depression, Charlotte becomes interested in Tina's welfare, and with Dr. Jaquith's permission, she takes her under her wing. When the girl improves, Charlotte takes her home to Boston.

Jerry and Dr. Jaquith visit the Vale home, where Jerry is delighted to see the change in his daughter. His initial concern for Charlotte, believing her to be sacrificing her freedom, proves wrong. Dr. Jaquith has allowed Charlotte to keep Tina there to understand that her relationship with Jerry will remain platonic. She tells Jerry that she sees Tina as his gift to her and her way of being close to him. When Jerry asks her if she is happy, she replies: "Oh, Jerry, don't let's ask for the moon. We have the stars."

Cast

 Bette Davis as Charlotte Vale
 Paul Henreid as Jeremiah "Jerry" Duvaux Durrance
 Claude Rains as Dr. Jaquith
 Gladys Cooper as Mrs. Windle Vale
 Bonita Granville as June Vale
 John Loder as Elliot Livingston
 Ilka Chase as Lisa Vale
 Lee Patrick as "Deb" McIntyre
 Franklin Pangborn as Mr. Thompson
 Katharine Alexander as Miss Trask (as Katherine Alexander)
 James Rennie as Frank McIntyre
 Mary Wickes as Nurse Dora Pickford
 Janis Wilson as Tina Durrance (uncredited)

Production
Filming ran from April 7 to June 23 of 1942 as producer Hal B. Wallis made Now, Voyager his first independent production at Warner Bros. under a new arrangement with the studio. He took an active role in the production, including casting decisions. The initial choices for Charlotte were Irene Dunne, Norma Shearer, and Ginger Rogers. When Bette Davis learned about the project, she campaigned for and won the role. More than any other of her previous films, Davis became absorbed in the role, not only reading the original novel, but also becoming involved in details such as choosing her wardrobe personally. Consulting with designer Orry-Kelly, she suggested a drab outfit, including an ugly foulard dress for Charlotte initially, to contrast with the stylish, "timeless" creations that mark her later appearance on the cruise ship.

The choice of Davis's leading men became important, as well. Davis was aghast at the initial costume and makeup tests of Austrian actor Paul Henreid; she thought the "slicked back" gigolo-like appearance  made him look "just like Valentino." Henreid was similarly uncomfortable with the brilliantine image, and when Davis insisted on another screen test with a more natural hairstyle, he was finally accepted as the choice for her screen lover. In her 1987 memoir, This 'N That, Davis revealed that co-star Claude Rains (with whom she also shared the screen in Juarez, Mr. Skeffington, and Deception) was her favorite co-star.

Initial production of the Prouty novel had to take into account that European locales would not be possible in the midst of World War II, despite the novelist's insistence on using Italy as the main setting. Prouty's quirky demands for vibrant colors and flashbacks shot in black and white with subtitles were similarly disregarded. Principal photography was shifted to Warner's sound stage 18 and various locations around California, including the San Bernardino National Forest, while European scenes were replaced by stock footage of Brazil. One of the primary reasons for Davis being interested in the original project was that photography would also take place in her hometown of Boston. Other locations of filming include Harvard Medical School in Roxbury, Massachusetts, Laguna Beach, Whitley Avenue, and other streets around Boston.

The film highlighted Davis's ability to shape her future artistic ventures, as not only did she have a significant role in influencing the decisions over her co-stars, but also the choice of director was predicated on a need to have a compliant individual at the helm. Davis previously had worked with Irving Rapper on films where he served as a dialogue director, but his gratitude for her support turned into a grudging realization that Davis could control the film. Although his approach was conciliatory, the to-and-fro with Davis slowed production and "he would go home evenings angry and exhausted". The dailies, however, showed a "surprisingly effective" Davis at the top of her form.

For years, Davis and co-star Paul Henreid claimed the moment in which Jerry puts two cigarettes in his mouth, lights both, then passes one to Charlotte, was developed by them during rehearsals, inspired by a habit Henreid shared with his wife, but drafts of Casey Robinson's script on file at the University of Southern California indicate it was included by the screenwriter in his original script. The scene remained an indelible trademark that Davis would later exploit as "hers".

Box office
According to Warner Bros. records, the film earned $2,130,000 domestically and $2,047,000 foreign.

Critical reception
Theodore Strauss, a critic for The New York Times, observed:

David Lardner of The New Yorker offered a similar opinion, writing that for most of the film, Davis "just plods along with the plot, which is longish and a little out of proportion to its intellectual content." Variety, however, wrote a more positive review, calling it the kind of drama that maintains Warner's pattern for box-office success ... Hal Wallis hasn't spared the purse-strings on this production. It has all the earmarks of money spent wisely. Irving Rapper's direction has made the picture move along briskly, and the cast, down to the most remote performer, has contributed grade A portrayals. Harrison's Reports called the film "intelligently directed" and praised Davis' performance as "outstanding", but warned that the film's "slow-paced action and its none-too-cheerful atmosphere make it hardly suitable entertainment for the masses."

Leslie Halliwell wrote in Halliwell's Film Guide: "A basically soggy script gets by, and how, through the romantic magic of its stars, who were all at their best; and suffering in mink went over very big in wartime."

Source material
Olive Higgins Prouty's novel, written in 1941, served as the basis for the film, and other than certain limitations imposed by World War II on the locations for filming, the movie remains fairly true to the novel.

The novel is considered to be one of the first, if not the first, fictional depictions of psychotherapy, which is depicted fairly realistically for the time, as Prouty herself spent time in a sanitarium following a mental breakdown in 1925. This was caused by the death of one of her daughters and proved to be a defining period in her professional life as a writer, as the experience she gained from this episode helped her write not only Now, Voyager, but also her 1927 novel Conflict, both of which have similar themes of recovery following a breakdown. Prouty also used this experience to help others in her life who were experiencing mental health issues, including her close friend Sylvia Plath, who was supported both financially and emotionally by Prouty following a suicide attempt in 1953.

The novel is the third in a pentalogy centered on the fictional Vale family, and by far the most popular. The other titles are The White Fawn (1931), Lisa Vale (1938), Home Port (1947), and Fabia (1951). The other novels in the series do not feature mental health as centrally as Now, Voyager, but themes and certain elements appear throughout. Many characters appear in multiple novels.

Awards and nominations
 Academy Award for Best Actress (Bette Davis, nominee)
 Academy Award for Best Supporting Actress (Gladys Cooper, nominee)
 Academy Award for Best Music, Scoring of a Dramatic or Comedy Picture (Max Steiner, winner)

References

Bibliography

 Davis, Bette with Michael Herskowitz. This 'N That. New York: G.P Putnam's Sons, 1987. 
 Leaming, Barbara. Bette Davis: A Biography. New York: Simon & Schuster, 1992. 
 Higham, Charles. Bette: The Life of Bette Davis. New York: Dell Publishing, 1981. 
 Moseley, Roy. Bette Davis: An Intimate Memoir. New York: Donald I. Fine, 1990. 
 Quirk, Lawrence J. Fasten Your Seat Belts: The Passionate Life of Bette Davis. New York: William Morrow and Company, 1990. 
 Schneider, Steven Jay. 1001 Movies You Must See Before You Die. Hauppauge, New York: Barron's Educational Series, 2005. 
 Spada, James. More Than a Woman: An Intimate Biography of Bette Davis. New York: Bantam Books, 1993.

External links

 Now Voyager essay by Charlie Achuff on the National Film Registry website
 
 
 
 
 ValeTales discussion of the novel and the movie
 Extensive summary and commentary at Filmsite.org
 Biography of Prouty
 Mother Monster: Gladys Cooper in Now, Voyager an essay by Ella Taylor at the Criterion Collection
 Now Voyager essay by Daniel Eagan in America's Film Legacy: The Authoritative Guide to the Landmark Movies in the National Film Registry, A&C Black, 2010 , pp. 353–355. America's Film Legacy: The Authoritative Guide to the Landmark Movies in the National Film Registry

Streaming audio
 Now, Voyager on Lux Radio Theatre: May 10, 1943
 Now, Voyager on Lux Radio Theatre: February 11, 1946

1942 films
1940s English-language films
1942 romantic drama films
American romantic drama films
American black-and-white films
Films scored by Max Steiner
Films about psychiatry
Films based on American novels
Films directed by Irving Rapper
Films set in Boston
Films set in Rio de Janeiro (city)
United States National Film Registry films
Warner Bros. films
Films that won the Best Original Score Academy Award
Films set on ships
Films produced by Hal B. Wallis
1940s American films